is a Japanese animator, director, character designer, and production designer. His work with directors Akiyuki Shinbo (and more broadly studio Shaft) and Kunihiko Ikuhara have gained noteworthy fame since the late 1990s and especially through the mid-2000s.

Career
Takeuchi was originally from sub-contracting animation studio Dragon Production, which he belonged to sometime during the mid-1980s. His tenure at the company was relatively short-lived as he transferred to Studio Lions, the in-between division to Studio Giants, soon thereafter; and eventually, he became a part of the larger Studio Giants entity. In the early 1990s, however, Takeuchi went freelance. Around 1994, he was offered a seat as a freelancer at Shaft and started to work on a number of their outsource works and eventually made his debut as an animation director on the studio's first original televised work, Juuni Senshi Bakuretsu Eto Ranger (1995).

In 1997, Takeuchi worked as the animation director for Shaft's outsourced episodes of Revolutionary Girl Utena directed by Kunihiko Ikuhara. Takeuchi's work on the series gained particular interest from Ikuhara, who invited him to work on the succeeding movie as an animation director. Also that year, Takeuchi participated as a character designer for Shaft's Sakura Diaries OVA series. The following year, in 1998, studio Radix was set to produce an adaptation of Silent Möbius, but the production ended up being outsourced to Shaft. Chief director Hideki Tonokatsu worked at Shaft, and Shaft became the main production site and also the company responsible for finding the series' staff; and finding interest in Takeuchi's work, saying that Takeuchi had a clear vision and direction, he was given the role of series "animation director" (not referring to the correction of drawings). Takeuchi's work from the series garnered interest from then-managing director of Shaft Mitsutoshi Kubota, who felt that Takeuchi would be a central figure in Shaft's succeeding productions.

For the next several years, Takeuchi continued to freelance as a key animator and animation director across several studios, even doing work for Studio Ghibli, but he gained prominence in 2004 when Shaft teamed up with Akiyuki Shinbo to produce Tsukuyomi: Moon Phase, the start of Shinbo and Shaft's long collaborative history. Shinbo was concerned with having a strong visual foundation for the series, and wanted someone with strong sensibilities for  material to work with; however, he did not want someone from a background art studio to take on the role, as was traditional. Kubota, who succeeded Shaft founder Hiroshi Wakao as CEO following Wakao's retirement, recommended Takeuchi to Shinbo, who then took on the role of "visual director." Takeuchi's work on the series, which featured cross-sections of buildings to show their insides, almost like a stage production, inspired Shinbo to use similar techniques on his next work, Pani Poni Dash!, despite Takeuchi not working on the series. However, Takeuchi collaborated more with Shaft in large roles as a production and concept designer in several succeeding works. In 2009, he participated again as a visual director on Shinbo and Tatsuya Oishi's adaptation of Bakemonogatari. Although he didn't continue throughout the rest of the franchise as its visual director, his work became a vital part of its production, and he contributed as an art setting or production designer across all other iterations of the series with the exception of the final two parts, Owarimonogatari II and Zoku Owarimonogatari.

Takeuchi occasionally did storyboard and episode director work since Silent Möbius, but he was given the opportunity to direct as a film director under Shinbo's chief direction with Fireworks in 2017. In 2019, he chief directed Ikuhara's Sarazanmai, and in 2022 contributed to both of Ikuhara's Re:cycle of the Penguindrum movies as their assistant director and Shaft's RWBY: Ice Queendom as its visual director.

Works
This is an incomplete list.

Teleivison series
 Highlights main directorial roles. Highlights other main animation staff member roles.

OVAs/ONAs

Films

Notes

Works cited

References

External links

Japanese animators
Living people
Japanese film directors
Anime directors